Jhakar Bigha is a small village in Rohtas district, in the Indian state of Bihar.

People 

Populations of Jhakar Bigha is about 800
The main occupation of the people agriculture and dairy farming.

Sita Ram Singh

Ram Adhar Singh and Bal Bacchan Singh

Hridya Nand Singh, Surendra Prasad Singh and Krishna Kant

Geography and climate
The village of Jhakar Bigha is located in the southwestern part of Bihar, North India, in a flat plain running alongside the Kaimur Range and Rohtas Plateau.  The majority of the land is a fertile floodplain of the Son River which is a tributary of the Ganges.

The climate is sub-tropical and typical of the plains of Northern India, with hot dry summers and cool winters with cold nighttime temperatures.  The monsoon season, from late June to in late September, plays a fundamental role for the village and the surrounding area because the economy is mainly based on agriculture.

References

Villages in Rohtas district